Terrible swift sword is a phrase from "The Battle Hymn of the Republic" by Julia Ward Howe.

Terrible Swift Sword may also refer to:
Terrible Swift Sword (game), a 1976 board wargame that simulates the Battle of Gettysburg
Terrible Swift Sword (The 4400), an episode of The 4400
Terrible Swift Sword (The Lost Regiment), the third book in William R. Forstchen's The Lost Regiment science fiction book series 
Terrible Swift Sword, the second volume of Bruce Catton's Centennial History of the Civil War